Number Ones is a compilation album by the Bee Gees released in 2004. It includes 18 of their greatest hits and a tribute to band member Maurice Gibb, who died in 2003. It is the final Bee Gees album released by Universal Records.

Rhino Records re-released Number Ones worldwide in 2008 using the European track list. Combining sales of versions issued by two different record companies, it has sold 1,236,000 copies in the US as of August 2012. The set, which peaked at No. 23 in the US on the Billboard Top 200 albums chart in 2004, re-entered the charts peaking at No. 5 in 2012. The following week after peaking at No. 5 the album plummeted to No. 195, the second-greatest drop for an album that still remained on the chart, in Billboard album history. This gives the group a span of 44 years, 9 months since their first Top 10 album, 1967's Bee Gees' 1st, which peaked at No. 7 in November 1967. The only other groups with longer spans are The Beach Boys (49 years 1 week), The Beatles (47 years 7 months), and The Rolling Stones (45 years 6 months).

Track listing

American release
 "Massachusetts" (1967) – 2:26
 "World" (1967) – 3:16
 "Words" (1968) – 3:17
 "I've Gotta Get a Message to You" (1968) – 2:52
 "I Started a Joke" (1968) – 3:10
 "Don't Forget to Remember" (1969) – 3:29
 "Lonely Days" (1970) - 3:48
 "How Can You Mend a Broken Heart" (1971) – 3:58
 "Jive Talkin'" (1975) – 3:46
 "You Should Be Dancing" (1976) – 4:17
 "Love So Right" (1976) - 3:37
 "How Deep Is Your Love" (1977) – 4:02
 "Stayin' Alive" (1977) – 4:44
 "Night Fever" (1977) – 3:33
 "Too Much Heaven" (1978) – 4:54
 "Tragedy" (1979) – 5:03
 "Love You Inside Out" (1979) – 4:12
 "You Win Again" (1987) – 4:04
 "Man in the Middle" (2001) – 4:22

European/Australian release
Two of the bonus tracks were new recordings of classic Gibb compositions originally recorded by other artists, including "Islands in the Stream" (Kenny Rogers and Dolly Parton), and "Immortality" (Celine Dion).

 "Massachusetts" – 2:26
 "World" – 3:16
 "Words" – 3:17
 "I've Gotta Get a Message to You" – 2:52
 "I Started a Joke" – 3:10
 "Don't Forget to Remember" – 3:29
 "How Can You Mend a Broken Heart" – 3:58
 "Jive Talkin'" – 3:46
 "You Should Be Dancing" – 4:17
 "How Deep Is Your Love" – 4:02
 "Stayin' Alive" – 4:44
 "Night Fever" – 3:33
 "Too Much Heaven" – 4:54
 "Tragedy" – 5:03
 "More Than a Woman" (1977) – 3:18
 "Love You Inside Out" – 4:12
 "You Win Again" – 4:04
 "Man in the Middle" – 4:22*
 "Islands in the Stream" (2001) – 4:22*
 "Immortality" (original demo version) (1996) – 4:16*

19/20: Bonus tracks
18: Special Maurice Gibb tribute track

List of actual number one singles as performers

Charts

Weekly charts

Year-end charts

Certifications

References

2004 greatest hits albums
Bee Gees compilation albums
Compilation albums of number-one songs
Universal Records compilation albums
Albums recorded at IBC Studios